Franklin Pierce Harter (September 19, 1886 – April 14, 1959) was a Major League Baseball pitcher. He pitched in parts of three seasons in the majors, from  until , for the Cincinnati Reds and Indianapolis Hoosiers.

External links

Major League Baseball pitchers
Cincinnati Reds players
Indianapolis Hoosiers players
Portsmouth Cobblers players
Marshalltown Ansons players
Baseball players from Illinois
1886 births
1959 deaths
People from Keyesport, Illinois